Barış Ermiş (born January 3, 1985) is a Turkish professional former basketball player.

Professional career
On August 13, 2008, he has signed with Türk Telekom.

After one season with Ermiş played for Türk Telekom, her transferred to Banvit B.K., in which he played three seasons between 2009-12 before he transferred to Fenerbahçe in the 2012-13 season.

He transferred to Türk Telekom third time for 2014-15 season and then on July 2, 2015 he moved to Tofaş, where he had 5 successful seasons between 2015-2020.

On July 3, 2020, he has signed with Galatasaray of the Turkish Basketbol Süper Ligi (BSL).

On August 27, 2021, he has announced his retirement from professional basketball.

Turkish national team
He was a member of the Turkish men's national U-16 (played in 2001), U-18 (2002) and U-20 teams (in 2005) at European Championships. Barış Ermiş won the silver medal at the 2010 FIBA World Championship with the national team. Ermiş played in the national team, which became champion at the 2013 Mediterranean Games.

Awards

National
 2010 FIBA World Championship - 
 2013 Mediterranean Games -

References

External links
 Player profile on tblstat.net
 Player profile on euroleague.net
  Player profile on turksports.net

1985 births
Living people
2010 FIBA World Championship players
2014 FIBA Basketball World Cup players
Anadolu Efes S.K. players
Bandırma B.İ.K. players
Beşiktaş men's basketball players
Competitors at the 2013 Mediterranean Games
Fenerbahçe men's basketball players
Galatasaray S.K. (men's basketball) players
Gaziantep Basketbol players
Karşıyaka basketball players
Mediterranean Games gold medalists for Turkey
Mediterranean Games medalists in basketball
Point guards
Basketball players from Istanbul
Tofaş S.K. players
Turkish men's basketball players
Türk Telekom B.K. players
21st-century Turkish people